Norman Wood Charlton III (born January 6, 1963), nicknamed "The Sheriff", is an American former professional baseball relief pitcher, who played in Major League Baseball (MLB) for the Cincinnati Reds, Seattle Mariners, Philadelphia Phillies, Baltimore Orioles, Atlanta Braves, and Tampa Bay Devil Rays.

Early life
Charlton was born in Fort Polk, Louisiana, and graduated from James Madison High School in San Antonio, Texas. He attended Rice University in Houston, Texas, playing for coach David Hall, before being drafted by the Montreal Expos with the 28th pick in the first round of the 1984 MLB June Amateur Draft.

Professional playing career

The left-handed Charlton was best known as being part of the infamous "Nasty Boys" relief pitching corps for the  Reds team who won the World Series. Randy Myers and Rob Dibble were the other two members. The Boys were renowned for their clutch, shutdown performances, particularly during the playoff run; their blazing fastballs; and their bruising beanballs. Charlton is also famous in Cincinnati for plowing over Mike Scioscia to score a run in a nationally televised Sunday night game.

Charlton was also a key member of the two most beloved Mariner teams. During the 1995 "Refuse to Lose" team that was the first Mariner team to reach the playoffs, he was the team's closer after a midseason trade. As a member of the 2001 team that won an MLB record 116 games, Charlton was a lefty specialist, fleshing out a bullpen which also featured Japanese closer Kazuhiro Sasaki, Jeff Nelson, and fellow lefty Arthur Rhodes.

Before the 1998 season, Charlton signed a contract to join the Baltimore Orioles bullpen. He was released on July 28. Charlton signed with the Braves a few days later.

Coaching career
On October 22, 2007, the Mariners named Charlton as their bullpen coach. His contract, along with those of the remainder of the 2008 coaching staff, was not renewed following the hire of Don Wakamatsu as the club's field manager in November 2008.

Personal life
Charlton graduated from Rice University in 1986 with political science major, but had enough credit hours to have also majored in religion or physical education. While at Rice, he played baseball for the Rice Owls and set multiple new university records in the sport, including a career ERA of 2.25 and an 11-win season. Charlton's father was also a Rice alumnus, had been an athlete there, and had worked in the university's physical education department.

References

External links

Norm Charlton at Pura Pelota (Venezuelan Professional Baseball League)]

 Norm Charlton at SABR (Baseball BioProject)

1963 births
Living people
Atlanta Braves players
Baltimore Orioles players
Baseball players from Louisiana
Baseball players from San Antonio
Cincinnati Reds players
Durham Bulls players
Louisville RiverBats players
Major League Baseball bullpen coaches
Major League Baseball pitchers
Minor league baseball coaches
Nashville Sounds players
National League All-Stars
People from Vernon Parish, Louisiana
Philadelphia Phillies players
Rice Owls baseball players
Rice University alumni
Richmond Braves players
Seattle Mariners coaches
Seattle Mariners players
Tacoma Rainiers players
Tampa Bay Devil Rays players
Tigres de Aragua players
American expatriate baseball players in Venezuela
Vermont Reds players
West Palm Beach Expos players